Hagenbecks Tierpark is a metro station on the Hamburg U-Bahn line U2. It is located in the Stellingen district of Hamburg within the borough of Eimsbüttel. It serves the Tierpark Hagenbeck.

History
In 1961, the Senate of Hamburg decided to build a cross-city route from Stellingen to Billstedt, whose already existing western part was extended from the former Hellkamp stop over the Lutterothstraße station to Hagenbeck's Tierpark, which was originally supposed to be called "Koppelstraße."  While the line to Lutterothstraße was opened in 1965, Hagenbecks Tierpark station was not opened until 30 October 1966. The new line replaced tram line 16.

For almost 19 years, Hagenbecks Tierpark was the terminus of the U2, until the extension to Niendorf Markt in 1985.

Service
Hagenbecks Tierpark station is served by the U2.

References 

Hamburg U-Bahn stations in Hamburg
Buildings and structures in Eimsbüttel
U2 (Hamburg U-Bahn) stations
Hamburg Hagenbeck
Hamburg Hagenbeck